The Ajdarbey Mosque (also known as the Blue Mosque, the Ittifag Mosque) is a historic mosque in Baku, Azerbaijan. It was built from 2 March 1912 to 3 December 1913 and is located on Samed Vurgun Street, formerly Krasnovodskaya Street, north of the city center.

The project of the mosque was made by the architect Zivar bey Ahmadbeyov, and the construction was sponsored by Haji Ajdar bey Ashurbeyov. The Kanni-Tepe city quarter, where the mosque was built, was at the time filled by one-floor private houses. The building of the mosque has an angle of approximately 45 degrees with Krasnovodskaya Street, so that the building could be better appreciated. For the same purpose, it was built on the slope of the hill.

The architecture is simple; there is big domed prayer room and a minaret next to it. An iwan is from the east of the prayer room, and a mihrab is from the south and the west. The dome is put on a tall tholobate, to enhance the volume. There is extensive and fine stone carving covering the walls. It was made by Salman Atayev, who also worked on other buildings in Baku constructed in the 1910s.

See also
 Islam in Azerbaijan
 List of mosques in Azerbaijan

References

Mosques in Baku
Zivar bey Ahmadbeyov buildings and structures